Pidonia ruficollis is a species of beetle in the family Cerambycidae. It was described by Say in 1824.

References

Lepturinae
Beetles described in 1824